Rhythm and Booms was an annual summer fireworks show in Madison, Wisconsin.

History 
The show was held on the last Saturday in June. From its inception in 1993 through 2013 the event was held at Warner Park. Upwards of 200,000 people regularly attended the celebration.

Location Change 
In 2014, the fireworks display moved from Warner Park to downtown Madison. Environmental concerns, nimbyism, and cost reduction were all cited by city officials as reasons for the move.

Demise 
In 2015, after 22 years, the celebration was cancelled by event organizers. Rhythm and Booms has since been replaced by a new event, Shake the Lake.

Fireworks 
30 minutes of fireworks were launched from Warner park on Madison’s north side.

Production 
The show was owned and operated by a 501(c)(3) non-profit organization, Madison Festivals, Inc. Some proceeds from Rhythm & Booms went to local charities, including American Family Children's Hospital.

References

External links
 Official website

Festivals in Wisconsin
Culture of Madison, Wisconsin
Tourist attractions in Madison, Wisconsin
Fireworks in the United States
Pyrotechnics
Annual events in Wisconsin
Festivals established in 1993
1993 establishments in Wisconsin
June events
2015 disestablishments in Wisconsin
Recurring events disestablished in 2015